The following outline is provided as an overview of and topical guide to Iraq:

Iraq – sovereign country located in Western Asia. Iraq spans most of the northwestern end of the Zagros mountain range, the eastern part of the Syrian Desert and the northern part of the Arabian Desert. It shares borders with Kuwait and Saudi Arabia to the south, Jordan to the west, Syria to the northwest, Turkey to the north, and Iran to the east. It has a very narrow section of coastline at Umm Qasr on the Persian Gulf. There are two major flowing rivers: the Tigris and the Euphrates. These provide Iraq with agriculturally capable land and contrast with the desert landscape that covers most of Western Asia.

General reference 

 Pronunciation: ɪˈrɑːk
 Common English country name: Iraq
 Official English country name: The Republic of Iraq
 Common endonym(s): Iraq (العراق)
 Official endonym(s): Iraq
 Adjectival(s): Iraqi 
 Demonym(s): Iraqi
 Etymology: Name of Iraq
 58th largest country
 36th most populous country
 ISO country codes:  IQ, IRQ, 368
 ISO region codes:  See ISO 3166-2:IQ
 Internet country code top-level domain:  .iq

Geography of Iraq 

Geography of Iraq
 Iraq is a: Country
 Location:
 Northern Hemisphere and Eastern Hemisphere
 Eurasia
 Asia
 Western Asia
 Fertile Crescent
 Mesopotamia
 Time zone:  UTC+03
 Extreme points of Iraq
 High:  Cheekha Dar 
 Low:  Arabian Gulf 0 m
 Land boundaries:  3,650 km
 1,458 km
 814 km
 605 km
 352 km
 240 km
 181 km
 Coastline:  Arabian Gulf 58 km
 Population of Iraq: 38,274,618 people (July 2017 estimate) – 36th most populous country
 Area of Iraq:   – 58th largest country
 Atlas of Iraq

Environment of Iraq 

Environment of Iraq
 Climate of Iraq
 Environmental issues in Iraq
 Renewable energy in Iraq
 Geology of Iraq
 Protected areas of Iraq
 Biosphere reserves in Iraq: None
 National parks of Iraq
 Wildlife of Iraq
 Fauna of Iraq
 Birds of Iraq
 Mammals of Iraq

Natural geographic features of Iraq 
 Glaciers of Iraq: None
 Islands of Iraq
 Lakes of Iraq
 Mountains of Iraq
 Volcanoes in Iraq
 Rivers of Iraq
 Waterfalls of Iraq
 Valleys of Iraq
 World Heritage Sites in Iraq

Regions of Iraq 

Regions of Iraq

Ecoregions of Iraq 

Ecoregions of Iraq

Administrative divisions of Iraq 

Administrative divisions of Iraq
 Regions of Iraq
 Governorates of Iraq
 Districts of Iraq
 Municipalities of Iraq

Governorates of Iraq 

Governorates of Iraq
Baghdad Governorate – Arab, Turkman, Assyrian, Kurdish
Saladin Governorate – Arab, Turkman
Diyala Governorate – Arab, Turkman, Kurdish
Wasit Governorate – Arab, Turkman
Maysan Governorate – Arab
Basra Governorate – Arab
Dhi Qar Governorate – Arab
Muthanna Governorate – Arab
Al Qadisyah Governorate – Arab
Babil Governorate – Arab, Turkman
Karbala Governorate – Arab
Najaf Governorate – Arab
Al Anbar Governorate – Arab
Nineveh Governorate – Arab, Turkman, Assyrian, Kurdish
Dahuk Governorate – Assyrian, Kurdish, Arab
Erbil Governorate – Turkman, Kurdish, Assyrian, Arab
Kirkuk Governorate – Turkman, Kurdish, Arab, Assyrian
As Sulaymaniyah – Kurdish, Assyrian

The constitutionally recognized Kurdistan Autonomous Region includes parts of a number of northern provinces, and is largely self-governing in internal affairs.

Districts of Iraq 

Districts of Iraq

Municipalities of Iraq 

Municipalities of Iraq
 Cities of Iraq
 Capital of Iraq: Baghdad

Demography of Iraq 

Demographics of Iraq

Government and politics of Iraq 
Politics of Iraq
 Form of government:
 Iraqi Interim Government
 Capital of Iraq: Baghdad
 Elections in Iraq
 Political parties in Iraq
 Provincial Iraqi Control
 Reconstruction of Iraq

Branches of the government of Iraq 

Government of Iraq

Executive branch of the government of Iraq 
 Head of state: President of Iraq, Fuad Masum
 Head of government: Prime Minister of Iraq, Haider al-Abadi
 Council of Ministers of Iraq

Legislative branch of the government of Iraq 
 Council of Representatives of Iraq (unicameral parliament)

Judicial branch of the government of Iraq 

Court system of Iraq
 Supreme Court of Iraq
 Central Criminal Court of Iraq

Foreign relations of Iraq 

Foreign relations of Iraq
 Diplomatic missions in Iraq
 Diplomatic missions of Iraq
 Iraqi diaspora

International organization membership 

International organization membership of Iraq
The Republic of Iraq is a member of:

Arab Bank for Economic Development in Africa (ABEDA)
Arab Fund for Economic and Social Development (AFESD) (suspended)
Arab Monetary Fund (AMF)
Council of Arab Economic Unity (CAEU)
Food and Agriculture Organization (FAO)
Group of 77 (G77)
International Atomic Energy Agency (IAEA)
International Bank for Reconstruction and Development (IBRD)
International Civil Aviation Organization (ICAO)
International Criminal Police Organization (Interpol)
International Development Association (IDA)
International Federation of Red Cross and Red Crescent Societies (IFRCS)
International Finance Corporation (IFC)
International Fund for Agricultural Development (IFAD)
International Labour Organization (ILO)
International Maritime Organization (IMO)
International Mobile Satellite Organization (IMSO)
International Monetary Fund (IMF)
International Olympic Committee (IOC)
International Organization for Standardization (ISO)
International Red Cross and Red Crescent Movement (ICRM)
International Telecommunication Union (ITU)

International Telecommunications Satellite Organization (ITSO)
Islamic Development Bank (IDB)
League of Arab States (LAS)
Multilateral Investment Guarantee Agency (MIGA)
Nonaligned Movement (NAM)
Organisation of Islamic Cooperation (OIC)
Organization of Arab Petroleum Exporting Countries (OAPEC)
Organization of Petroleum Exporting Countries (OPEC)
Permanent Court of Arbitration (PCA)
United Nations (UN)
United Nations Conference on Trade and Development (UNCTAD)
United Nations Educational, Scientific, and Cultural Organization (UNESCO)
United Nations Industrial Development Organization (UNIDO)
Universal Postal Union (UPU)
World Customs Organization (WCO)
World Federation of Trade Unions (WFTU)
World Health Organization (WHO)
World Intellectual Property Organization (WIPO)
World Meteorological Organization (WMO)
World Tourism Organization (UNWTO)
World Trade Organization (WTO) (observer)

Law and order in Iraq 

Law of Iraq
 Capital punishment in Iraq
 Constitution of Iraq
 Crime in Iraq
 Human rights in Iraq
 LGBT rights in Iraq
 Freedom of religion in Iraq
 Law enforcement in Iraq
 Iraqi Police

Military of Iraq 

Military of Iraq
 Command
 Commander-in-chief:
 Ministry of Defence of Iraq
 Forces
 Army of Iraq
 Navy of Iraq
 Air Force of Iraq
 Special forces of Iraq
 Military history of Iraq
 Military ranks of Iraq

Local government in Iraq 

Local government in Iraq

History of Iraq 

History of Iraq
Timeline of the history of Iraq
Current events of Iraq
 History by year: 2001 • 2002 • 2003 • 2004 • 2005 • 2006 • 2007 • 2008 • 2009 • 2010 • 2011 • 2012 • 2013 • 2014 • 2015 • 2016 • 2017 • 2018 • 
 Military history of Iraq
 Iraq and weapons of mass destruction
 Iraq War
 2003 invasion of Iraq
 Casualties of the Iraq War
 Iraqi insurgency
 History of Iraqi insurgency
 Rationale for the Iraq War
 Terrorist attacks of the Iraq War
 Timeline of the Iraq War
 Post-invasion Iraq, 2003–present

Culture of Iraq 

Culture of Iraq

 Architecture of Iraq
 Cuisine of Iraq
 Festivals in Iraq
 Languages of Iraq
 Media in Iraq
 National symbols of Iraq
 Coat of arms of Iraq
 Flag of Iraq
 National anthem of Iraq
 People of Iraq
 Ethnic minorities in Iraq
 Prostitution in Iraq
 Public holidays in Iraq
 Records of Iraq
 Religion in Iraq
 Christianity in Iraq
 Hinduism in Iraq
 Islam in Iraq
 Judaism in Iraq
 Sikhism in Iraq
 World Heritage Sites in Iraq

Art in Iraq 
 Art in Iraq
 Cinema of Iraq
 Literature of Iraq
 Music of Iraq
 Television in Iraq
 Theatre in Iraq

Sport in Iraq 

Sport in Iraq
 Most popular sport: Football (soccer)
 Iraq Football Association
 Iraq national football team
 Iraq Super League
 List of football stadiums in Iraq

Economy and infrastructure of Iraq 

 Economic rank, by nominal GDP (2017): 54th (Fifty-Fourth)
 Agriculture in Iraq
 Banking in Iraq
 Central Bank of Iraq
 Communications in Iraq
 Internet in Iraq
 Television in Iraq
 Companies of Iraq
Currency of Iraq: Dinar
ISO 4217: IQD
 Energy in Iraq
 Energy policy of Iraq
 Oil industry in Iraq
 Health care in Iraq
 Mining in Iraq
 Iraq Stock Exchange
 Tourism in Iraq
 Transport in Iraq
 Airports in Iraq
 Ports of Iraq
 Rail transport in Iraq
 Roads in Iraq
 Water supply and sanitation in Iraq

Education in Iraq 

Education in Iraq

Health in Iraq 

Health in Iraq

See also 

Iraq
List of international rankings
Member states of the United Nations
Outline of Asia
Outline of geography

References

External links 

Government
Iraqi Presidency Website http://www.iraqipresidency.net
Iraqi Government Website http://www.cabinet.iq
Iraqi Parliament Website http://www.parliament.iq
Ministry of Foreign Affairs  http://www.mofa.gov.iq
Ministry of Defense  https://web.archive.org/web/20170918022601/http://iraqmod.org/
Ministry of Oil              https://web.archive.org/web/20170802182657/http://www.oil.gov.iq/
Ministry of Trade            http://www.mot.gov.iq
Ministry of Industry         https://web.archive.org/web/20181111035130/http://www.industry.gov.iq/
Ministry of Higher Education          http://www.mohesr.gov.iq
Kurdistan Regional Government
New Iraqi government structure (PDF) (As of July 17, 2006)

Overviews
Encarta Encyclopedia
al-Bab – Iraq
Iraq Inter-Agency Information & Analysis Unit Reports, Maps and Assessments of Iraq from the UN Inter-Agency Information & Analysis Unit
Encyclopædia Britannica Iraq Country Page
BBC News Country Profile – Iraq
CIA World Factbook – Iraq
US State Department – Iraq includes Background Notes, Country Study and major reports
Read Congressional Research Service (CRS) Reports regarding Iraq
Iraq Country Profile from Reuters AlertNet
Country Briefing: Iraq from The Economist

News
Focus on Iraq Daily News on Iraq
Iraq News and Iraqi views from Electronic Iraq
News in Depth from the Financial Times
Diplomacy Monitor-Iraq
IPS Inter Press Service Independent news about Iraq
Iraqis react with joy, anger to Hussein death sentence CNN story on Hussein's death sentence
Hometown Baghdad Documentary series shot by an all-Iraqi crew. Tells the stories of three young people trying to survive in Baghdad.

Other
Operation Iraqi Children
Iraq Image, a cultural resource on Iraq cities and locations
 Iraqi Truth Project
Juan Cole, a leading scholar and public intellectual
The Ground Truth Project—A series of exclusive interviews and other resources capturing the voices of Iraqis, aid workers, military personnel and others who have spent significant time on-the-ground in Iraq.

Alternate wiki article about Iraq
The World Monuments Fund's Iraq Cultural Heritage Conservation Initiative
Education for Peace in Iraq Center (EPIC)—A Washington DC-based nonprofit organization promoting a free and secure Iraq
IRAQ: Systematic torture of political prisoners. Amnesty International. 2001.
Internal Displacement in Iraq – Internal Displacement Monitoring Centre
CPA Iraq (Coalition Provisional Authority) Now-defunct occupation authority; site is archived
Iraq Law from the University of Pittsburgh's Jurist project
1900–2000 a history of Iraq
US Embassy in Baghdad, Iraq
Iraqi Familiarization Guide – (546 kilobyte PDF file)
Short Guide to Iraq (WWII U.S. Military Guide)
Charity Helping the People of Iraq

Geography of Iraq
Iraq